This is a list of members of the European Parliament for Spain elected at the 2014 European Parliament election in Spain, and who served in the Eighth European Parliament.

References

External links 

Spain
List
2014